Smithson Investment Trust is a large British investment trust dedicated to investments in small and mid sized listed or traded companies internationally with a market cap (at the time of investment) of between £500 million to £15 billion. Established in 2010, the company is a constituent of the FTSE 250 Index. The chairman is Diana Dyer Bartlett.

References

External links
  Official site

Investment trusts of the United Kingdom
Companies listed on the London Stock Exchange